Grand Prix Leende or GP Leende is an elite women's road bicycle race held annually since 2012 in Leende, Netherlands. The time trial is together with the time trial at the Omloop van Borsele, part of the Dutch national time trial competition (Dutch: KNWU tijdritcompetitie).

Past winners

References

External links

Recurring sporting events established in 2012
2012 establishments in the Netherlands
Women's road bicycle races
Cycle races in the Netherlands
Cycling in Heeze-Leende